Michael McLendon (born November 14, 1963) is an American politician and insurance producer who has served in the Mississippi State Senate from the 1st district since 2020.

Early life and education 
McLendon was born in Dallas and later moved to Tennessee, where he attended Oakhaven Baptist Academy in Memphis. He graduated from Memphis State University, earning a degree in business and marketing.

Career 
McLendon worked as an insurance agent for Farm Bureau Insurance of Tennessee, before later joining Lipscomb & Pitts Insurance in 2013. In the same year, he ran for the Hernando City Council and became a councilmember.

In 2019, he ran for election to the Mississippi State Senate to represent District 1, which represents part of DeSoto county  He finished second in the Republican primary and came first in the Republican primary runoff election. He won the general election uncontested.

For the 2021 session, he serves as the Vice-Chair for the Insurance Committee and is a member on the following committees: Appropriations, Business and Financial Institutions, Education, Highways and Transportation, Municipalities, Investigate State Offices, and technology.

Personal life 
He is a member of the Methodist Church. He is married to Vickey Blythe McLendon and has two children, Dr. Hunter McLendon and Sadler McLendon.

References 

1963 births
21st-century American politicians
American businesspeople in insurance
Insurance agents
Living people
Mississippi city council members
Republican Party Mississippi state senators
Politicians from Dallas
University of Memphis alumni